Olcott Hawthorne Deming (February 28, 1909 – March 20, 2007) was an American career diplomat who was the first ambassador of the United States to Uganda.

Early life
Deming, a great-grandson of Nathaniel Hawthorne, was born February 28, 1909, in Westchester County, New York.

He graduated from Rollins College in 1935, and worked for the Tennessee Valley Authority and as a teacher in Greenwich, Connecticut.

Career
Deming joined the State Department in 1942.  From 1957 to 1959, he was U.S. consul general in Okinawa.  He served as Ambassador to the newly independent nation of Uganda from 1962 to 1965.  He retired in 1969, later becoming an official of the American Foreign Service Association.

Later life
Deming died March 20, 2007, aged 98 of sepsis at a hospice in Washington, D.C.

External links
 New York Times obituary, Apr. 7, 2007
 Washington Post obituary, March 23, 2007

1909 births
2007 deaths
Deaths from sepsis
Ambassadors of the United States to Uganda
Rollins College alumni
Infectious disease deaths in Washington, D.C.
People from Westchester County, New York
United States Foreign Service personnel
American expatriates in Japan